Middlebrook may refer to:

Places

Australia 

 Middlebrook, Queensland, a locality in the Tablelands Region

United Kingdom 

Middlebrook, Greater Manchester, an out-of-town complex near Bolton, England

United States 

Middlebrook, New Jersey, an unincorporated community in Somerset County
Middlebrook, Virginia, census-designated place in Augusta County
Middlebrook Historic District, Augusta County, Virginia
Middlebrook encampment, an American Independence War seasonal encampment
Middlebrook (Knoxville, Tennessee), historic house in Knoxville, Tennessee

People
 Middlebrook (surname), an English surname
 Middlebrook baronets, of Oakwell in the Parish of Birstall in the County of York

See also
 Middle Brook (disambiguation)
 Middlebrooks, surname